Storage Networking World (SNW) is a conference for data storage professionals in the United States.  Sponsored by Computerworld and the Storage Networking Industry Association, SNW was held twice each year.  Common locations include Orlando, Florida, Grapevine, Texas, Phoenix, Arizona and San Diego, California. The event is oriented towards manufacturers and consumers of enterprise storage equipment and software, and is often the site of product launches and announcements. These events started in the fall of 1999, and the last event was held in the fall of 2013. The event dates and locations are listed below:

The corresponding conference in Europe is called SNW Europe and commonly occurs in Frankfurt, Germany. Additional conferences were held in China, Japan, and Australia.

References

External links 
 
 SNW Europe

Data storage conferences